Trésor Ndikumana (born 25 April 1998) is a Burundian international footballer who plays as a midfielder for Kenyan Premier League side AFC Leopards and the Burundi national football team.

International career
Ndikumana made his senior international debut in a 7–0 friendly victory over Djibouti, scoring two goals.

International statistics

International goals
Scores and results list Burundi's goal tally first.

References

External links
 
 Trésor Ndikumana at Footballdatabase

1998 births
Living people
Burundian footballers
Burundi international footballers
Association football midfielders
Amagaju F.C. players
A.F.C. Leopards players
Kenyan Premier League players
Burundian expatriate sportspeople in Rwanda
Burundian expatriate sportspeople in Kenya
Expatriate footballers in Rwanda
Expatriate footballers in Kenya